Anastasiya Kolesava (born 2 June 2000) is a Belarusian professional racing cyclist, who currently rides for UCI Women's Continental Team . She rode in the women's road race at the 2019 UCI Road World Championships in Yorkshire, England.

References

External links

2000 births
Living people
Belarusian female cyclists
Place of birth missing (living people)